Shen Jiawei (born 1948) is a Chinese Australian painter. He is a winner of the 2006 Sir John Sulman Prize.

Life and work
Shen Jiawei was born in Shanghai and emigrated to Australia in 1989 after he was compelled to leave China because he painted heroes of the Chinese nationalist movement. He was largely self-taught and became popular with the Chinese government for his 'revolutionary' images of workers and soldiers. His best known work from that period, "Standing Guard for Our Great Motherland" (1974) was subsequently shown in the Guggenheim Museum, both in New York City and Bilbao, in the China: 5000 Years exhibition, 1998.

In 1995 Shen won the Mary MacKillop Art Award and received a medal from Pope John Paul II. He is now one of Australia's leading portrait artists known for the academic and literary qualities of his works.

Shen is also a painter of large-scale history pictures represented in major public collections; including the National Art Gallery of China and the Museum of the Chinese Revolution in Beijing. His more playful works examine political and cross-cultural issues through appropriation. "Absolute Truth" (2000) shows Mikhail Gorbachev and the Pope conversing in the Sistine Chapel and in "Wise Men from the East" (2002) the Magi in Leonardo da Vinci's unfinished Adoration of the Magi are Chinese sages.

Recent portraits include former Melbourne Lord Mayor John So in a possum skin cloak (2003), Tom Hughes AO QC, the portrait of Crown Princess Mary of Denmark (2005) which hangs in the National Portrait Gallery, Canberra and the portrait of John Howard, former Prime Minister of Australia, which hangs in the Members' Hall of the Australian Parliament House as part of the Historic Memorials Collection.

In 2006, he won the Sir John Sulman Prize.

Shen and some of his work featured in the 2001 Australian documentary "Yum Cha Cha", directed by Boyd Britton.

He was an Archibald Prize finalist in 1993, 1994, 1995, 1996, 1997, 1998, 1999, 2002, 2004, 2005, 2006, 2011, 2012 and 2015.

Shen Jiawei's art "Yalda Our Girl" was selected for 8th Beijing International Art Biennale China 2019.

In 2019, Shen Jiawei painted a portrait of philanthropist, Susan Wakil, AO, wearing an outfit by her favourite designer, Yves Saint Laurent (designer), from a photograph, commissioned by Isaac Wakil, her husband of 62 years. The portrait was gifted to the National Art Gallery by Isaac Wakil in 2019.

Shen's wife Lan Wang is also a painter, as well as sculptor.

References

External links
 Australian National Trust gallery
 Portraits at the National Portrait Gallery, Canberra
 Art Trail Australia

1948 births
Australian painters
Painters from Shanghai
Living people
Australian people of Chinese descent
Archibald Prize finalists
Archibald Prize Salon des Refusés People's Choice Award winners